The Davies equation is an empirical extension of Debye–Hückel theory which can be used to calculate activity coefficients of electrolyte solutions at relatively high concentrations at 25 °C. The equation, originally published in 1938, was refined by fitting to experimental data.

The second term, goes to zero as the ionic strength goes to zero, so the equation reduces to the Debye–Hückel equation at low concentration. However, as concentration increases, the second term becomes increasingly important, so the Davies equation can be used for solutions too concentrated to allow the use of the Debye–Hückel equation. For 1:1 electrolytes the difference between measured values and those calculated with this equation is about 2% of the value for 0.1 M solutions. The calculations become less precise for electrolytes that dissociate into ions with higher charges.

See also
 Osmotic coefficient
 Pitzer equations

References

Thermodynamic equations
Chemical thermodynamics
Equilibrium chemistry
Electrochemical equations